Erik Säfström (born 8 May 1988) is a Swedish professional bandy half-back.

Career

Club career
Säfström is a youth product of Örebro and has represented their senior team, Sandviken, and SKA-Neftyanik.

International career
Säfström was part of Swedish World Champions teams of 2012 and 2017.

Honours

Country
 Sweden
 Bandy World Championship: 2012, 2017

References

External links
 
 

1988 births
Living people
Swedish bandy players
Örebro SK Bandy players
Sandvikens AIK players
SKA-Neftyanik players
Sweden international bandy players
Bandy World Championship-winning players